UHF generally refers to "Ultra high frequency", a radio frequency range.

UHF may also refer to:

Film and television
 UHF television broadcasting, the use of the UHF frequency range for television
 UHF (film), a 1989 comedy film starring "Weird Al" Yankovic and Michael Richards
 UHF (Independent UHF Broadcasting), a Japanese television network
 UHF anime, as programming carried by these Japanese independents

Music
 UHF (Canadian band), a folk music supergroup
 UHF (album)
 UHF II
 UHF (Portuguese band), a rock band
 Ultra High Frequency (band), a New York-based alternative rock band
 UHF, an alias used for a one off single also titled "UHF" by Moby
 UHF – Original Motion Picture Soundtrack and Other Stuff, soundtrack to the film UHF

Radio
 UHF CB, an Australian two-way radio service
 UHF connector, a threaded radio frequency coaxial connector

Other
 UHF (Ultra High Frequency), a 1990s alternative fashion magazine spun off from Option
 Unrestricted Hartree–Fock, an SCF-MO method for calculating open-shell systems
 United Hospital Fund, a non-profit health policy research organization in New York, United States
 United Housing Foundation, a real estate investment trust in New York, United States